Augusta (minor planet designation: 254 Augusta) is a main-belt asteroid, discovered on 31 March, 1886 by astronomer Johann Palisa at Vienna Observatory, Austria. The stony S-type asteroid measures about 12 kilometers in diameter. It is the first-numbered member of the Augusta family, after which the small Asteroid family and subgroup of the main-belt has been named. Augusta was named after the German–Austrian writer Auguste von Littrow (1819–1890), widow of astronomer Carl Ludwig von Littrow, who was a former director of the Vienna Observatory.

References

External links 
 
 The Asteroid Orbital Elements Database
 Minor Planet Discovery Circumstances
 Asteroid Lightcurve Data File
 
 

000254
Discoveries by Johann Palisa
Named minor planets
000254
18860331